Ben Howe may refer to:
 Ben Howe (politician)
 Ben Howe (artist)
 Ben Howe (speedway rider)